Luciano Berio  (24 October 1925 – 27 May 2003) was an Italian composer noted for his experimental work (in particular his 1968 composition Sinfonia and his series of virtuosic solo pieces titled Sequenza), and for his pioneering work in electronic music. His early work was influenced by Igor Stravinsky and experiments with serial and electronic techniques, while his later works explore indeterminacy and the use of spoken texts as the basic material for composition.

Biography 
Berio was born in Oneglia (now part of Imperia), on the Ligurian coast of Italy. He was taught piano by his father and grandfather, who were both organists. During World War II, he was conscripted into the army, but on his first day, he injured his hand while learning how a gun worked and spent time in a military hospital. 

Following the war, Berio studied at the Milan Conservatory under Giulio Cesare Paribeni and Giorgio Federico Ghedini. He was unable to continue studying the piano because of his injured hand, so instead concentrated on composition. In 1947, he had first public performance of one of his works, a suite for piano. Berio made a living at this time by accompanying singing classes, and it was in doing this that he met the American mezzo-soprano Cathy Berberian, whom he married shortly after graduating (they divorced in 1964). They had one daughter, Cristina Berio (born in 1953). Berio wrote a number of pieces that exploited her distinctive voice.

In 1952, Berio went to the United States to study with Luigi Dallapiccola at Tanglewood, from whom he gained an interest in serialism. He later attended the Internationale Ferienkurse für Neue Musik at Darmstadt, where he met Pierre Boulez, Karlheinz Stockhausen, György Ligeti and Mauricio Kagel.  He became interested in electronic music, co-founding the Studio di fonologia musicale, an electronic music studio in Milan, with Bruno Maderna in 1955. He invited a number of significant composers to work there, among them Henri Pousseur and John Cage. He also produced an electronic music periodical, Incontri Musicali.

In 1960, Berio returned to Tanglewood, this time as Composer in Residence, and in 1962, on an invitation from Darius Milhaud, took a teaching post at Mills College in Oakland, California. From 1960 to 1962, Berio also taught at the Dartington International Summer School. In 1965, he began to teach at the Juilliard School, and there he founded the Juilliard Ensemble, a group dedicated to performances of contemporary music. In 1966, he again married, this time to the noted philosopher of science Susan Oyama (they divorced in 1972). His students included Louis Andriessen, Steven Gellman, Dina Koston, Steve Reich, Luca Francesconi, Giulio Castagnoli, Flavio Emilio Scogna, William Schimmel and Phil Lesh of the Grateful Dead.

All this time, Berio had been steadily composing and building a reputation, winning the Prix Italia in 1966 for Laborintus II, a work for voices, instruments and tape with text by Edoardo Sanguineti that was commissioned by the French Television to celebrate the 700th anniversary of Dante Alighieri birth. His reputation was cemented when his Sinfonia was premiered in 1968. In 1972, Berio returned to Italy.  From 1974 to 1980, he was the director of the electro-acoustic division of IRCAM in Paris. He married the musicologist Talia Pecker in 1977. 

In 1987, he opened Tempo Reale, a centre for musical research and production based in Florence.  In 1988, he was made an Honorary Member of the Royal Academy of Music, London. The following year, he received the Ernst von Siemens Music Prize. He was elected a Foreign Honorary Member of the American Academy of Arts and Sciences in 1994. The same year, he became Distinguished Composer in Residence at Harvard University, remaining there until 2000. In 1993–94, he gave the Charles Eliot Norton lectures at Harvard, later published as Remembering the Future.  In 2000, he became Presidente and Sovrintendente at the Accademia Nazionale di Santa Cecilia in Rome. 

Berio was active as a conductor and continued to compose to the end of his life. He died in 2003 in a hospital in Rome. He was an atheist.

He was noted for his sense of humour. He gave a two-hour seminar at a summer school in the United States analyzing Beethoven's 7th Symphony, demonstrating that it was a work of radical genius. The next day he gave another two-hour seminar, with a completely straight face, showing why it was hopelessly flawed and a creative dead-end.

Work 

Berio's electronic work dates for the most part from his time at Milan's Studio di Fonologia. One of the most influential works he produced there was Thema (Omaggio a Joyce) (1958), based on Cathy Berberian reading from James Joyce's Ulysses, which can be considered as the first electroacoustic composition in the history of western music made with voice and elaboration of it by technological means. A later work, Visage (1961) sees Berio creating a wordless emotional language by cutting up and rearranging a recording of Cathy Berberian's voice; therefore the composition is based on the symbolic and representative charge of gestures and voice inflections, “from inarticulate sounds to syllables, from laughter to tears and singing, from aphasia to inflection patterns from specific languages: English and Italian, Hebrew and the Neapolitan dialect."

In 1968, Berio completed O King a work which exists in two versions: one for voice, flute, clarinet, violin, cello and piano, the other for eight voices and orchestra. The piece is in memory of Martin Luther King Jr., who had been assassinated shortly before its composition. In it, the voice(s) intones first the vowels, and then the consonants which make up his name, only stringing them together to give his name in full in the final bars.The orchestral version of O King was, shortly after its completion, integrated into what is perhaps Berio's most famous work, Sinfonia (1967–69), for orchestra and eight amplified voices. The voices are not used in a traditional classical way; they frequently do not sing at all, but speak, whisper and shout. The third movement is a collage of literary and musical quotations. A-Ronne (1974) is similarly collaged, but with the focus more squarely on the voice. It was originally written as a radio program for five actors, and reworked in 1975 for eight vocalists and an optional keyboard part. The work is one of a number of collaborations with the poet Edoardo Sanguineti, who for this piece provided a text full of quotations from sources including the Bible, T. S. Eliot and Karl Marx.

Another example of the influence of Sanguineti is the large work Coro (premiered 1977), scored for orchestra, solo voices, and a large choir, whose members are paired with instruments of the orchestra. The work extends over roughly an hour, and explores a number of themes within a framework of folk music from a variety of regions: Chile, North America, Africa. Recurrent themes are the expression of love and passion; the pain of being parted from loved ones; the death of a wife or husband. A line repeated often is "come and see the blood on the streets", a reference to a poem by Pablo Neruda, written in the context of the outbreak of the civil war in Spain.

In the last period of his production Berio was also interested in the use of live electronics, applied in some compositions as Ofanìm (1988–1997) and Altra voce (1999): the electronic music and technical part of such pieces was always performed by the musicians of Tempo Reale.

Sacher 

Along with eleven other composers, (Conrad Beck, Pierre Boulez, Benjamin Britten, Henri Dutilleux, Wolfgang Fortner, Alberto Ginastera, Cristóbal Halffter, Hans Werner Henze, Heinz Holliger, Klaus Huber and Witold Lutosławski), Berio was asked by the cellist Mstislav Rostropovich to celebrate the Swiss conductor Paul Sacher's 70th birthday by composing a solo cello piece using the letters of Sacher's name (eS, A, C, H, E, Re). This was published under the name 12 Hommages à Paul Sacher. Berio's piece is called Les mots sont allés (The Words Are Gone). Some of the resulting compositions were performed in Zurich on 2 May 1976 and the whole "Sacher" project was first performed completely by Czech cellist František Brikcius in Prague in 2011. Music Les mots sont allés has been performed since by cellists Siegfried Palm, Jean-Michelle Fonteneau, and Alexander Ezerman among others.

Sequenza 

Berio composed a series of virtuoso works for solo instruments under the name Sequenza. The first, Sequenza I came in 1958 and is for flute; the last, Sequenza XIV (2002) is for cello. These works explore the full possibilities of each instrument, often calling for extended techniques.

The various Sequenze are as follows:

Sequenza I for flute (1958);
Sequenza II for harp (1963);
Sequenza III for woman's voice (1966);
Sequenza IV for piano (1966);
Sequenza V for trombone (1966);
Sequenza VI for viola (1967);
Sequenza VII for oboe (1969) (rev. by Jacqueline Leclair and renamed Sequenza VIIa in 2000);
Sequenza VIIb for soprano saxophone (adaptation by Claude Delangle in 1993);
Sequenza VIII for violin (1976);
Sequenza IXa for clarinet (1980);
Sequenza IXb for alto saxophone (adaptation by the composer in 1981);
Sequenza IXc for bass clarinet (adaptation by Rocco Parisi in 1998);
Sequenza X for trumpet in C and piano resonance (1984);
Sequenza XI for guitar (1987–88);
Sequenza XII for bassoon (1995);
Sequenza XIII for accordion "Chanson" (1995);
Sequenza XIVa for violoncello (2002);
Sequenza XIVb for double bass (adaptation by Stefano Scodanibbio in 2004).

Stage works 
Opera (1970, revised 1977)
La vera storia (1982)
Un re in ascolto (1984)
Vor, während, nach Zaide (1995; Prelude, interlude and ending for an opera fragment by Mozart)
Outis (1996)
Cronaca del luogo (1999)
Turandot (2001; Ending for the Puccini opera)

Transcriptions and arrangements 
Berio is known for adapting and transforming the music of others, but he also adapted his own compositions: the series of Sequenze gave rise to a series of works called Chemins each based on one of the Sequenze. Chemins II (1967), for instance, takes the original Sequenza VI (1967) for viola and adapts it for solo viola and nine other instruments. Chemins II was itself transformed into Chemins III (1968) by the addition of an orchestra, and there also exists Chemins IIb, a version of Chemins II without the solo viola but with a larger ensemble, and Chemins IIc, which is Chemins IIb with an added solo bass clarinet. The Sequenze were also shaped into new works under titles other than Chemins; Corale (1981), for example, is based on Sequenza VIII.

As well as original works, Berio made a number of arrangements of works by other composers, among them Claudio Monteverdi, Henry Purcell, Johannes Brahms, Gustav Mahler and Kurt Weill. For Berberian he wrote Folk Songs (1964; a set of arrangements of folk songs). He also wrote an ending for Giacomo Puccini's opera Turandot (premiered in Las Palmas on 24 January 2002 and in the same year in Los Angeles, Amsterdam and Salzburg) and in Rendering (1989) took the few sketches Franz Schubert made for his Symphony No. 10 and completed them by adding music derived from other Schubert works.

Transcription is a vital part of even Berio's original works. In "Two Interviews", Berio mused about what a college course in transcription would look like, looking not only at Franz Liszt, Ferruccio Busoni, Igor Stravinsky, Johann Sebastian Bach, himself, and others, but to what extent composition is always self-transcription. In this respect, Berio rejected and distanced himself from notions of collage, preferring instead the position of "transcriber", arguing that "collage" implies a certain arbitrary abandon that runs counter to the careful control of his highly intellectual play, especially within Sinfonia but throughout his "deconstructive" works. Rather, each quotation carefully evokes the context of its original work, creating an open web, but an open web with highly specific referents and a vigorously defined, if self-proliferating, signifier-signified relationship. "I'm not interested in collages, and they amuse me only when I'm doing them with my children: then they become an exercise in relativizing and 'decontextualizing' images, an elementary exercise whose healthy cynicism won't do anyone any harm", Berio told interviewer Rossana Dalmonte.

Perhaps Berio's most notable contribution to the world of post-WWII non-serial experimental music, running throughout most of his works, is his engagement with the broader world of critical theory (epitomized by his lifelong friendship with linguist and critical theorist Umberto Eco) through his compositions. Berio's works are often analytic acts: deliberately analysing myths, stories, the components of words themselves, his own compositions, or preexisting musical works. In other words, it is not only the composition of the collage that conveys meaning; it is the particular composition of the component "sound-image" that conveys meaning, even extra-musical meaning. The technique of the collage, that he is associated with, is, then, less a neutral process than a conscious, Joycean process of analysis-by-composition, a form of analytic transcription of which Sinfonia and the Chemins are the most prominent examples. Berio often offers his compositions as forms of academic or cultural discourse themselves rather than as "mere" fodder for them.

Among Berio's other compositions are Circles (1960), Sequenza III (1966), and Recital I (for Cathy) (1972), all written for Berberian, and a number of stage works, with Un re in ascolto, a collaboration with Italo Calvino, the best known.

Berio's "central instrumental focus", if such a thing exists, is probably with the voice, the piano, the flute, and the strings. He wrote many remarkable pieces for piano which vary from solo pieces to essentially concerto pieces (points on the curve to find, concerto for two pianos, and Coro, which has a strong backbone of harmonic and melodic material entirely based on the piano part).

Lesser known works make use of a very distinguishable polyphony unique to Berio that develops in a variety of ways. This occurs in several works, but most recognisably in compositions for small instrumental combinations. Examples are Différences, for flute, harp, clarinet, cello, violin and electronic sounds, Agnus, for three clarinets and voices, Tempi concertanti for flute and four instrumental groups, Linea, for marimba, vibraphone, and two pianos, and Chemins IV, for eleven strings and oboe, as well as Canticum novissimi testamenti for 8 voices, 4 clarinets and saxophone quartet.

Honours 
 1994: Knight Grand Cross of the Order of Merit of the Italian Republic

References

Further reading 

 Peter Altmann, Sinfonia von Luciano Berio. Eine analytische Studie, Vienna: Universal Edition, 1977.
 Gianmario Borio, Musikalische Avantgarde um 1960. Entwurf einer Theorie der informellen Musik, Laaber: Laaber Verlag, 1993.
 Ute Brüdermann, Das Musiktheater von Luciano Berio, Bern/Frankfurt/New York, Peter Lang 2007.
 Claudia Sabine Di Luzio, Vielstimmigkeit und Bedeutungsvielfalt im Musiktheater von Luciano Berio, Mainz, Schott 2010.
 Norbert Dressen, Sprache und Musik bei Luciano Berio. Untersuchungen zu seinem Vokalschaffen, Regensburg, Bosse 1982.
 Giordano Ferrari, Les débuts du théâtre musical d'avantgarde en Italie, Paris, L'Harmattan 2000.
 Thomas Gartmann, »...dass nichts an sich jemals vollendet ist.« Untersuchungen zum Instrumentalschaffen von Luciano Berio, Bern/Stuttgart/Wien 1995.
 René Karlen and Sabine Stampfli (eds.), Luciano Berio. Musikmanuskripte, (= »Inventare der Paul Sacher Stiftung«, vol. 2), Basel: Paul Sacher Stiftung, 1988.
 Jean-François Lyotard, "'A Few Words to Sing': Sequenza III", in: Jean-François Lyotard, Miscellaneous Texts II: Contemporary Artists. Leuven: Leuven University Press, 2012. 
 Jürgen Maehder, Zitat, Collage, Palimpsest ─ Zur Textbasis des Musiktheaters bei Luciano Berio und Sylvano Bussotti, in Hermann Danuser/Matthias Kassel (eds.), Musiktheater heute. Internationales Symposion der Paul Sacher Stiftung Basel 2001, Mainz, Schott 2003, .
 Jürgen Maehder, Giacomo Puccinis "Turandot" und ihre Wandlungen ─ Die Ergänzungsversuche des III. "Turandot"-Aktes, in: Thomas Bremer and Titus Heydenreich (eds.), Zibaldone. Zeitschrift für italienische Kultur der Gegenwart, vol. 35, Tübingen: Stauffenburg 2003, pp. 50–77.
 Florivaldo Menezes, Un essai sur la composition verbale électronique »Visage« de Luciano Berio, ("Quaderni di Musica/Realtà", vol. 30), Modena 1993.
 Florivaldo Menezes, Luciano Berio et la phonologie. Une approche jakobsonienne de son œuvre, Frankfurt, Bern, New York: Peter Lang 1993.
 Fiamma Nicolodi, Pensiero e giuoco nel teatro di Luciano Berio, in: Fiamma Nicolodi, Orizzonti musicali italo-europei 1860–1980. Rome: Bulzoni. 1990, pp. 299–316.
 David Osmond-Smith, Playing on Words. A Guide to Berio's »Sinfonia«, London (Royal Musical Association) 1985.
 David Osmond-Smith (ed.), Luciano Berio. Two Interviews with Rossana Dalmonte and Bálint András Varga. New York/London: [S.n.], 1985.
 David Osmond-Smith, Berio, (= Oxford Studies of Composers, vol. 24), Oxford, New York: Oxford University Press, 1991.
 David Osmond-Smith, Nella festa tutto? Structure and Dramaturgy in Luciano Berio's »La vera storia«, in: Cambridge Opera Journal 9 (1997), pp. 281–294.
 David Osmond-Smith, Here Comes Nobody: A Dramaturgical Exploration of Luciano Berio's "Outis", in: Cambridge Opera Journal 12/2000, pp. 163–178.
 Michel Philippot, Entretien Luciano Berio, in: La Revue Musicale, numéro spécial Varèse ─ Xenakis ─ Berio ─ Pierre Henry, Paris 1968, pp. 85–93.
 Enzo Restagno (ed.), Berio, Torino: EDT, 1995.
 Edoardo Sanguineti, Teatro. K, Passaggio, Traumdeutung, Protocolli, Milan: Feltrinelli, 1969.
 Edoardo Sanguineti, Per Musica, edited by Luigi Pestalozza, Modena, Milan: Mucchi and Ricordi, 1993.
 Charlotte Seither, Dissoziation als Prozeß. "Sincronie for string quartet" von Luciano Berio, Kassel: Bärenreiter 2000.
 Peter Stacey, Contemporary Tendencies in the Relationship of Music and Text with Special Reference to "Pli selon pli" (Boulez) and "Laborinthus II" (Berio), New York, London: Garland, 1989.
 Ivanka Stoïanova, Verbe et son "centre et absence". Sur "Cummings ist der Dichter" de Boulez, "O King" de Berio et "Für Stimmen... Missa est" de Schnebel, in: Musique en jeu, 1 (1974), pp. 79–102.
 Ivanka Stoïanova, Texte ─ geste ─ musique, Paris: 10/18, 1978, ("O King", pp. 168–173).
 Ivanka Stoïanova, Prinzipien des Musiktheaters bei Luciano Berio – "Passaggio", "Laborintus II", "Opera", in: Otto Kolleritsch (ed.), Oper heute. Formen der Wirklichkeit im zeitgenössischen Musiktheater, Studien zur Wertungsforschung 16, Graz, Wien: Universal Edition 1985, pp. 217–227.
 Ivanka Stoïanova, "Luciano Berio. Chemins en musique". La Revue Musicale Nos. 375–377 (1985).
 Ivanka Stoïanova, Procédés narratifs dans le théâtre musical récent: L. Berio, S. Bussotti et K. Stockhausen, in: Ivanka Stoïanova, Entre Détermination et aventure. Essais sur la musique de la deuxième moitié du XXème siècle, Paris: L'Harmattan, 2004, pp. 243–276.
 Marco Uvietta, "È l'ora della prova": un finale Puccini-Berio per »Turandot«, in: Studi musicali 31/2002, pp. 395–479; English translation: "È l'ora della prova": Berio's finale for Puccini's "Turandot", in: Cambridge Opera Journal 16 (2004), pp. 187–238.
 Matthias Theodor Vogt, Listening as a Letter of Uriah: A note on Berio's "Un re in ascolto" (1984) on the occasion of the opera's first performance in London (9 February 1989), in: Cambridge Opera Journal 2/1990, pp. 173–185.

External links 

Luciano Berio biography and works, Universal Edition

Tempo Reale, Florence, centre for music research founded by Berio
Luciano Berio biography, The Modern Word.
The Living Composers Project, "Luciano Berio" biography and list of works

Obituary from The Daily Telegraph
Obituaries: "Luciano Berio Is Dead at 77; Composer of Mind and Heart", The New York Times, by Paul Griffiths (28 May 2003)
CompositionToday, "Luciano Berio" by Gavin Thomas
"Berio/Dubuffet – a conversation" (compiled by John Fowler, 1996)
A brief analysis of Luciano Berio's Sinfonia , Allen B. Ruch (2003)
"The maestro they love to hate", John Whiting (1996)
"This Represents at Least a Thousand Words I Was Not Counting On" review of Berio's Sinfonia, by Grant Chu Covell (November 2005)
Interview with Luciano Berio by Bruce Duffie, 4 January 1993

1925 births
2003 deaths
20th-century classical composers
20th-century Italian composers
20th-century Italian male musicians
Twelve-tone and serial composers
String quartet composers
Italian classical composers
Italian opera composers
Electronic composers
Italian male classical composers
Male opera composers
Grammy Award winners
Prix Italia winners
Recipients of the Praemium Imperiale
Wolf Prize in Arts laureates
Ernst von Siemens Music Prize winners
International Rostrum of Composers prize-winners
Honorary Members of the Royal Academy of Music
Members of the European Academy of Sciences and Arts
Fellows of the American Academy of Arts and Sciences
Harvard University faculty
Juilliard School faculty
Deutsche Grammophon artists
RCA Victor artists
Academic staff of the Accademia Nazionale di Santa Cecilia
Mills College faculty
People from Imperia
Pupils of Giorgio Federico Ghedini
Pupils of Luigi Dallapiccola
Knights Grand Cross of the Order of Merit of the Italian Republic